Hello is a bridge convention used for intervention over an opponent's 1NT opening. It allows for all one- and two-suited hands to be shown, and - for one suited hands - retains the ability to transfer.

History
The name of the convention is  derived from the names two of its inventors, Jerry Helms and Bill Lohmann.  Jerry Helms had previously co-developed "Helms", similar to the Cappelletti convention and saw this as an improvement to that convention. Helms considered that using 2 to show a major used up no bidding space and therefore lost the preemptive value typically attached to bidding major suits.

Description
It features the following calls:

Double is for penalty
2 shows diamonds or a major-minor two suiter. Responder transfers to 2 which is either passed or advanced (diamond suit) or a major is bid (2 suiter, unspecified minor)
2 is a transfer to hearts
2 shows both majors (responder may pass or correct to 2)
2 shows spades (natural bid)
2NT is a transfer to clubs
3 shows both minors (responder may pass or adjust to 3)
3 shows both Majors with massive playing strength (responder takes a preference to 3 or 3, or jumps to 4 or 4 with supporting values)

By design, in many cases, the advancer will become declarer, thus placing the strong 1NT hand on opening lead.

See also
 List of defenses to 1NT

References

Further reading
 Helms, Jerry (2006) Helms to Hello

Bridge conventions